UTRdb is a  database of 5' and 3' untranslated sequences of eukaryotic mRNAs

See also
 Five prime untranslated region
 Three prime untranslated region
 UTRome

References

External links
 data

Biological databases
RNA
Gene expression